Watsessing is a neighborhood and census-designated place (CDP) in Bloomfield Township, Essex County, New Jersey, United States. It is in the southwest corner of the township, bordered to the northwest by Glen Ridge, to the southwest by East Orange, to the southeast by the Ampere North part of Bloomfield, and to the northeast by the rest of Bloomfield. Watsessing Park is in the center of the community, in the valley of the Second River or Watsessing River, part of the Passaic River watershed. 

The Garden State Parkway runs through the center of the community, on the southeast side of Watsessing Park, with access from Exit 148. The parkway leads north  to Clifton and south through East Orange  to Irvington. The NJ Transit Montclair-Boonton Line has two stops in the community: Watsessing Avenue in the southeast and Bloomfield in the northeast.

Watsessing was first listed as a CDP prior to the 2020 census.

Demographics

References 

Census-designated places in Essex County, New Jersey
Census-designated places in New Jersey
Bloomfield, New Jersey